Ancient Philosophy is a peer-reviewed academic journal devoted to the study of ancient Greek and Roman philosophy and science. Since 1980 it has published over 1,300 articles and reviews in this field. This journal has a Level 2 classification from the Publication Forum of the Federation of Finnish Learned Societies. and a SHERPA/RoMEO "green" self-archiving policy. It is edited by Ron Polansky in the Department of Philosophy at Duquesne University. It is published on behalf of Mathesis Publications by the Philosophy Documentation Center.

Notable contributors 
Seth Benardete
Richard Bett
Jaako Hintikka
Drew Hyland
Gareth Matthews
Alasdair MacIntyre
Roger Scruton
Gisela Striker
Gregory Vlastos

Indexing
Ancient Philosophy is abstracted and indexed in Academic OneFile, L'Année philologique, ERIH PLUS, Humanities Index, Index Religiosus, International Bibliography of Book Reviews of Scholarly Literature, International Bibliography of Periodical Literature, International Philosophical Bibliography, Periodicals Index Online, The Philosopher's Index, PhilPapers, Religion and Philosophy Index, and Scopus, and TOC Premier.

See also 
 List of philosophy journals

References

External links 
 
 Philosophy Documentation Center

Biannual journals
Classics journals
English-language journals
Publications established in 1980
Ancient philosophy journals
Philosophy Documentation Center academic journals